Baba Qasem (also Romanized as Bābā Qāsem; also known as Bāba Gūsam) is a village in Gamasiyab Rural District, in the Central District of Nahavand County, Hamadan Province, Iran. At the 2006 census, its population was 1,723, in 443 families.

References 

Populated places in Nahavand County